Franz Samohyl (3 April 1912 – 14 June 1999) was an Austrian violinist, concertmaster of the Vienna State Opera and academic teacher.

Life 
He attended master classes for chamber music with Franz Mairecker from 1933 to 1935 and followed private studies with Ernst Morawec and Arnold Rosé.

In 1930, he founded the Vienna Philharmonia Quartet, with which he travelled abroad to England, Hungary, Italy and Germany. Samohyl was concertmaster of the Vienna Chamber Orchestra from 1932 and of the orchestra of the Vienna Volksoper from 1934. From 1936, he was first violinist of the Vienna Philharmonic and the Vienna State Opera Orchestra, serving as its concertmaster in 1947.

From 1946 to 1982, he taught violin and viola at the Vienna Academy of Music and Performing Arts (now the University of Music and Performing Arts Vienna) and was dean of the Stringed Instruments Department from 1964 to 1972. In addition, he taught from 1964 to 1974 at the Mozarteum University Salzburg.

Awards 
 1946: Appointment as professor at the Akademie für Musik und darstellende Kunst
 1965: Decoration of Honour for Services to the Republic of Austria
 1966: Mozart Medal of the Mozartgemeinde Wien
 1970: Österreichisches Ehrenkreuz für Wissenschaft und Kunst I. Klasse
 1972: Silver 
 1976: Großes Silbernes Ehrenzeichen für Verdienste um die Republik Österreich
 1977: Nicolai Medal in Gold for outstanding services to the Vienna Philharmonic
 1980: Silbernes Komturkreuz des Ehrenzeichens für Verdienste um das Bundesland Niederösterreich
 1982: Order of the Sacred Treasure
 1987: Goldenes 
 1988: Goldene Ehrenmedaille of the Universität Mozarteum Salzburg

References

External links 
 Franz Samohyl im Personenlexikon der Österreichischen Nationalbibliothek, retrieved 6 August 2021
 

Concertmasters of the Vienna Philharmonic
Austrian music educators
Austrian classical violinists
Academic staff of the University of Music and Performing Arts Vienna
Recipients of the Austrian Cross of Honour for Science and Art, 1st class
Recipients of the Order of the Sacred Treasure
1912 births
1999 deaths
Musicians from Vienna